Matilda McNamara (born 18 December 1998) is an Australian soccer player who plays as a defender for Adelaide United of the A-League Women.

Club career

Adelaide United
McNamara made her senior debut for Adelaide United on the 19th of December 2015 in a 5–1 win against Newcastle Jets.

International career
In June 2022, after an impressive season with Adelaide United, McNamara was called up to Australia's senior national team for their friendlies against Spain and Portugal. She made her debut on 15 November 2022 in a friendly against Thailand.

References

1998 births
Living people
Australian women's soccer players
Women's association football defenders
Adelaide United FC (A-League Women) players
Australia women's international soccer players
Australian expatriate sportspeople in Denmark
Expatriate women's footballers in Denmark
Australian expatriate women's soccer players
AGF Fodbold (women) players
Elitedivisionen players